Microoptoelectromechanical systems (MOEMS), also known as optical MEMS, are integrations of mechanical, optical, and electrical systems that involve sensing or manipulating optical signals at a very small size. MOEMS includes a wide variety of devices, for example optical switch, optical cross-connect, tunable VCSEL, microbolometers. These devices are usually fabricated using micro-optics and standard micromachining technologies using materials like silicon, silicon dioxide, silicon nitride and gallium arsenide.

Merging technologies

MOEMS includes two major technologies, microelectromechanical systems and micro-optics. Both these two technologies independently involve in batch processing similar to integrated circuits, and micromachining similar to fabrication of microsensor.

Parallel with MEMS developments and even earlier, sensor technology advanced to microsensors and joining with microactuators. Development of microsensors and microactuators were also due to a mother technology of micromachining. Micromachining is the root of everything we have today in high technology. This technology was never credited in history as it deserved. It was commercially used during the 1960s in Switzerland, for micromachining quartz orders of magnitudes harder than micromachining silicon. MEMS acronym was so powerful during the 1980s, that with no choice microsensors and microactuators that included micromachining, all joined MEMS.

History of MOEMS

During 1991-1993, Dr. M. Edward Motamedi, a former Rockwell International innovator in the areas of both microelectromechanical systems and micro-optics, used internally the acronym of MOEMS for microoptoelectromechanical systems. This was to distinguish between optical MEMS and MOEMS, where optical MEMS could include bulk optics but MOEMS is truly based on microtechnology where MOEMS devices are batch-processed exactly like integrated circuits, but this is not true in most cases for optical MEMS.

In 1993, Dr. Motamedi officially introduced MOEMS for the first time, as the powerful combination of MEMS and micro-optics, in an invited talk at the SPIE Critical Reviews of Optical Science and Technology conference in San Diego. In this talk Dr. Motamedi introduced the figure below, for showing that MOEMS is the interaction of three major microtechnologies; namely micro-optics, micromechanics, and microelectronics.

See also
 Microoptomechanical systems
 Nanoelectromechanical systems
 Microfabrication
 Microscanner

References

Bibliography
 P. Rai-Choudhury (editor), MEMS and MOEMS. Technology and applications, SPIE Press, Washington, 2000.
 Optical MEMS: From micromirrors to complex systems, IEEE Journal of Microelectromechanical Systems (2014)

Optoelectronics